Alipur-2 village comes under the Jalandhar East development block of Jalandhar. Jalandhar is a district in the Indian state of Punjab.

About 
Alipur-2 lies on the Jalandhar-Phagwara road. The nearest railway station to Alipur-2 is Chaheru Railway station at 6 km from it.

References 

Villages in Jalandhar district